The 1936–37 Hovedserien season was the third season of ice hockey in Norway. Eight teams participated in the league, and Grane won the championship.

First round

Group A

Group B

Final 
 Grane - Ski- og Fotballklubben Trygg 1:1/2:1

Relegation

First round
 Furuset Ishockey - Gjøa Ishockey 1:0

Second round
 Stabæk Idrettsforening - Gjøa Ishockey 2:0

External links 
 Norwegian Ice Hockey Federation

Nor
GET-ligaen seasons
1936–37 in Norwegian ice hockey